Konfrontacja Sztuk Walki (English: Martial Arts Confrontation) better known by its initials KSW, is widely considered to be the premiere mixed martial arts organization in Poland and one of the leading in Europe.

This list is an up-to-date roster of those fighters currently under contract with the KSW League. With fighters whose contract status cannot be determined, if will be included on this list if they have fought within the last two years for the promotion. Unlike the UFC, KSW does allow its fighters to compete in other promotions, so many fighters on this list may appear in MMA events outside of KSW. Each fight record has four categories: wins, losses, draws, and no-contests. All fight records in this article are displayed in that order, with fights resulting in a no-contest listed in parentheses.

Notes
 The tables are sortable and the calculation for Endeavor and MMA records (win–loss–draw (no contest)) are formulated as follows: Fight records calculation: (1) Plus one point of the total wins for fighters have not loss a fight; (2) Negative points of total loses for fighters have not won a fight; (3) Add number of wins to the winning percentage; (4) A draw counts as 0.5 (5) No contest does not factor as one of the variables of the calculation.
 Plus one point of the total wins for fighters having not lost a fight: 5–0–0 = 6
 Negative points of total losses for fighters having not won a fight: 0–3–0 = -3
 Add number of wins to the winning percentage: 10–1–0 = 10.90 | 10 + (10/11)
 A draw counts as 0.5: 8–4–1 = 8.65 | 8 + (8.5/13)
 No contest does not factor as one of the variables of the calculation: 8–2–0 (1 NC) = 8.80 | 8 + (8/10)

Fighters

Heavyweight (265 Ib, 120.2 kg)

Light Heavyweight (205 Ib, 93 kg)

Middleweight (185 Ib, 83.9 kg)

Welterweight (170 Ib, 77.1 kg)

Lightweight (155 Ib, 70.3 kg)

Featherweight (145 Ib, 65.8 kg)

Bantamweight (135 Ib, 61.2 kg)

Women's Flyweight (125 Ib, 56.7 kg)

Women's Strawweight (115 Ib, 52.2 kg)

 Unless otherwise cited, all records are retrieved from tapology.com.

References

See also
List of current KSW Champions
List of KSW events
2023 in KSW 
KSW Rankings
List of current UFC fighters 
List of current ACA fighters
List of current Bellator fighters
List of current Brave CF fighters
List of current Combate Global fighters
List of current ONE fighters
List of current Invicta FC fighters
List of current PFL fighters
List of current Rizin FF fighters
List of current Road FC fighters

External links

Konfrontacja Sztuk Walki
Lists of mixed martial artists